Eucalyptus notabilis, commonly known as Blue Mountains mahogany or mountain mahogany, is a species of small to medium-sized tree endemic to eastern Australia. It has rough, fibrous bark on the trunk and branches, lance-shaped to curved adult leaves, flower buds in groups of between seven and eleven, white flowers and hemispherical or conical fruit.

Description
It has persistent, rough, stringy, grey to reddish brown bark on the trunk and branches. Flowering has been recorded in October and the flowers are white.

Taxonomy and naming
Eucalyptus notabilis was first formally described in 1920 by Joseph Maiden in Journal and Proceedings of the Royal Society of New South Wales from specimens collected at Glenbrook by Richard Cambage and Maiden. The specific epithet (notabilis) is a Latin word meaning "noteworthy", referring to the stature of some examples of this species. Maiden referred to it as "a handsome species".

Distribution and habitat
Blue Mountains mahogany grows at high altitude in dry forest and occurs in disjunct areas between the Lamington Plateau in south-eastern Queensland, the Gibraltar Range and the Blue Mountains.

References 

notabilis
Myrtales of Australia
Flora of New South Wales
Flora of Queensland
Plants described in 1920
Taxa named by Joseph Maiden